Barry Maguire (born 27 October 1989) is a Dutch professional footballer who plays as a defensive midfielder for GVVV.

Youth career
Maguire started to play football at amateur club Theole, in his native town of Tiel. Here he was scouted by FC Den Bosch.

Club career

FC Den Bosch 
At the age of 16, he joined FC Den Bosch's first squad.

Utrecht 
Maguire moved on to FC Utrecht in 2008. He scored Utrecht's fourth goal in their 4–0 win over Celtic in their Europa League play-off win in August 2010.

The development of a long-lasting injury to his back which also affected his left calf muscle caused Maguire to miss games and eventually have to move to less challenging leagues, in the hope of regaining his fitness.

Sarpsborg 08 FF 
He joined Norwegian team Sarpsborg 08 FF in the summer of 2015.

TEC 
Maguire moved to TEC in January 2017, after troubles with injuries and the expiration of his contract with Sarpsborg 08 FF. In the summer he was unable to agree a contract extension and left the club.

Limerick 
Maguire moved from local club TEC to Limerick in February 2018. During his time at the club, which was struggling to avoid relegation for most of the season, he managed to become the one of the team's highest scorers, with most of his goals coming from late runs into the box. He scored three goals but failed to save his team from relegation.

Geylang International 
In January 2019 it was announced that Maguire had joined Singapore Premier League club Geylang International. He won the 2020 Singapore Premier League Goal of the Year award a goal in a 2–1 win over the Young Lions in August.

Return to Den Bosch 
After his contract with Geylang International expired Maguire trained with former club FC Den Bosch for three weeks. He subsequently agreed a contract until the end of the season in January 2022.

International career
Maguire represented the Republic of Ireland Under-16 and the Netherlands Under-19 teams, since his father is Irish, Maguire can still represent either the Netherlands and the  Republic of Ireland at senior competitive level.

On 27 January 2009, Barry Maguire was called up to the Republic of Ireland Under 21 squad for the first time, but he rejected the invitation the following day. In September 2010 he declared himself eager to represent Ireland.

Career statistics

Club

References

External links
 Voetbal International profile 
 

1989 births
Living people
People from Tiel
Dutch people of Irish descent
Association football midfielders
Dutch footballers
FC Den Bosch players
FC Utrecht players
VVV-Venlo players
Sarpsborg 08 FF players
SV TEC players
Limerick F.C. players
Geylang International FC players
Derde Divisie players
Eerste Divisie players
Eredivisie players
League of Ireland players
Eliteserien players
Dutch expatriate footballers
Dutch expatriate sportspeople in Norway
Expatriate footballers in Norway
Republic of Ireland youth international footballers
Netherlands youth international footballers
Dutch expatriate sportspeople in Singapore
Expatriate footballers in Singapore
Footballers from Gelderland
Irish expatriate sportspeople in Singapore
Irish expatriate sportspeople in Norway